The 6th Asian Film Awards is an intra-continental annually-presented award ceremony hosted during the Hong Kong International Film Festival to honour the best Asian films of 2011.

Awards were presented in 14 general categories. People's Choice Awards were also presented for Favorite Actor and Favorite Actress. In addition, three special awards were also given, the Lifetime Achievement Award, The Edward Yang New Talent Award and The Asian Film Award for 2011's Top Grossing Asian Film. Nominations were announced on January 17, 2012 and the ceremony took place on March 19, 2012.

The awards were held at the Grand Hall of the Hong Kong Convention and Exhibition Center as part of the Entertainment Expo's Opening Gala. It was broadcast in aTV World on March 20 and in aTV Asia on March 22.

Jury

The jury for the awards consisted of 12 members from various countries; filmmakers, producers, critics and delegates from other international film festivals were a part of the jury.

 Eric Khoo 
 Ronald Arguelles 
 John Badalu 
 Peggy Chiao 
 Ishizaka Kenji 
 Christian Jeune 

 Kong Rithdee 
 Christoph Terhechte 
 Jacob Wong 
 Patricia Cheng 
 Cho Young-Chung 
 Xie Fei

Winners and nominees
Winners are listed first and highlighted in bold.

People's Choice Awards

Special awards

 Lifetime Achievement Award

 Ann Hui 

 The Edward Yang New Talent Award

 Edwin 

 The Asian Film Award for 2011's Top Grossing Asian Film

 Let the Bullets Fly /

Films with multiple awards and nominations

 Multiple awards
These films won more than one award at the ceremony :

 Four : Nader and Simin, A Separation
 Three : Wu Xia
 Two : A Simple Life, The Flying Swords of Dragon Gate

 Multiple nominations
These films received more than one nomination at the awards :

 Eight : The Flying Swords of Dragon Gate
 Six : Nader and Simin, A Separation, The Flowers of War, Seediq Bale
 Four : A Simple Life, Wu Xia
 Three : Lovely Man, The Front Line, The Woman in the Septic Tank, You Are the Apple of My Eye, You Don't Get Life a Second Time,
 Two : 11 Flowers, Chronicle of My Mother, Hara-Kiri: Death of a Samurai, Overheard 2, Postcard, Starry Starry Night, The Dirty Picture, The Mirror Never Lies, The Outrage, War of the Arrows, White Vengeance

Nations who received awards and nominations

Awards

The awards tally includes People's Choice Awards and special awards.

Nominations

The nominations tally includes People's Choice Awards nominations. 

Notes
a: The term "Mainland China" was used  to refer to the People's Republic of China.
b: The term "Taiwan" was used to refer to the Republic of China.
c: 6 awards are shared between Hong Kong and Mainland China.
d: 18 nominations are shared with Hong Kong, France and Taiwan.
e: 16 nominations are shared with China and Taiwan.
f: 2 nominations are shared with China and Hong Kong.
g: France was included because of the co-production with China for the film, 11 Flowers, thus sharing 2 nominations with China.

Performers

 Khalil Fong — "Johnny B. Goode"
 Joanna Wang — "Apathy"
 GACKT — "Ghost"

Presenters

 Jia Zhangke & Josie Ho — presented Best Screenwriter
 Gwei Lun-mei & Wing Shya — presented Best Cinematographer
 Vivienne Tam & Shawn Yue — presented the Best Costume Designer
 Donny Damara  & Daniel Lee — presented Best Production Designer
 Michelle Chen, Ko Chen-tung & Giddens Ko — presented Best Composer
 Lee Chang-dong — presented The Edward Yang New Talent Award
 Chen Daming & Zhang Jingchu — presented Best Visual Effects
 Umin Boya & Mario Maurer — presented Best Editor
 Wilfred Wong — presented People's Choice Awards for Favorite Actor & Favorite Actress
 Ng See-yuen — presented The Asian Film Award for 2011's Top Grossing Asian Film
 Andy Lau & Yoon Eun-hye — presented Best Newcomer
 Eugene Domingo & Qin Hailu — presented Best Supporting Actor
 Ananda Everingham & Karina — presented Best Supporting Actress
 Sylvia Chang & Deanie Ip — presented Lifetime Achievement Award
 Karen Mok & Joe Odagiri — presented Best Actor
 Gu Changwei & Xu Fan — presented Best Actress
 Lee Lieh & Lu Chuan — presented Best Director
 Eric Khoo & Siqin Gaowa — presented Best Film

References

External links
 Official site

Asian Film Awards ceremonies
2011 film awards
2012 in Hong Kong
Film
Hong Kong